Jesús García Tena (born 7 June 1990) is a Spanish football coach and former professional player who played as a defender.

Career
Born in Terrassa, Barcelona, Catalonia, García spent his early career in Spain and Italy with Juventus, Espanyol, Sabadell, Terrassa and Cuneo. He signed for Scottish club Livingston in August 2012. On 2 May 2013, it was announced that he was leaving the club after the 2012–13 season.

He signed a short-term contract with Hamilton Academical in September 2013, stating that he was "really happy" with the move. In December 2013 the contract was extended until the end of the 2013–14 season. In July 2014 his contract was again extended, before being extended again in January 2015, until May 2016. It was again extended for a further year in May 2016. He suffered a knee injury in the first game of the 2016–17 season, in a League Cup game; it was announced he would miss most of the season. He was released by Hamilton in April 2017. He later said that he had felt "frozen out" at the club following injury problems.

On 21 September 2017, García Tena signed for Edinburgh City on a contract until January 2018, having spent time on trial at the club. After one season with the side, he left the club in May 2018.

In June 2018 he began a role as head coach of the under-20s at Newtongrange Star.

He signed for Stenhousemuir for the 2018–19 season, leaving the club after six months in January 2019. He then made 2 Cup appearances for Bonnyrigg Rose Athletic in April 2019.

Tena signed for Tranent Juniors in 2020, but left the club in 2021.

Career statistics

Personal life
His younger brother Pol García Tena is also a footballer.

References

1990 births
Living people
Footballers from Terrassa
Spanish footballers
Livingston F.C. players
Hamilton Academical F.C. players
Scottish Football League players
Spanish expatriate footballers
Expatriate footballers in Scotland
Spanish expatriate sportspeople in Scotland
CE Sabadell FC footballers
Terrassa FC footballers
A.C. Cuneo 1905 players
Expatriate footballers in Italy
Spanish expatriate sportspeople in Italy
Juventus F.C. players
RCD Espanyol footballers
Scottish Professional Football League players
F.C. Edinburgh players
Stenhousemuir F.C. players
Association football defenders
Bonnyrigg Rose Athletic F.C. players
Tranent Juniors F.C. players
Spanish football managers
Spanish expatriate football managers
Expatriate football managers in Scotland